The 2017 season is Meralco Manila's first and only season in the Philippines Football League, the top flight of Philippines football.

Preseason and friendlies

Stallion Invitational Cup

Competitions

Philippines Football League

Regular season

Note:
 a Because of the ongoing works in the Marikina Sports Complex, the team will play its first few league games at the Biñan Football Stadium and Rizal Memorial Stadium and will have to groundshare with Stallion Laguna and Meralco Manila, respectively.
 b The home stadium of the club is located in Bantay, Ilocos Sur, a nearby town of Vigan. For administrative and marketing purposes, the home city of Ilocos United is designated as "Vigan"
 c Because of the ongoing works in the University of San Carlos Stadium, the team will play its first few league games at the Rizal Memorial Stadium in Manila and will have to groundshare with Meralco Manila.

Final Series

 The game is considered as a Home Game for Global Cebu. Game will be played in RMS due to unavailability of Global's home stadium, the Cebu City Sports Complex.

League squad

References

F.C. Meralco Manila seasons
Meralco Manila 2017
Meralco Manila 2017